Bolt is a surname. Notable people with the surname include:

Andrew Bolt (b. 1959), Australian newspaper columnist
Alex Bolt (b. 1993), Australian tennis player
Bobby Bolt (1912–1991), Scottish footballer
Bruce Bolt (1930–2005), American professor
Carol Bolt (1941–2000), Canadian author
Chris Bolt (b. 1953), British economist
David Bolt (disambiguation), several people
Dirk Bolt (1930–2020), Dutch-born architect
George Bolt (1893–1963), New Zealand aviator
George T. Bolt (1900–1971), New Zealand government figure
Herbert Bolt (1893–1916), Australian rugby league player and WWI soldier
Jan Bolt (1876–1967), Dutch athlete in gymnastics
Jeremy Bolt (fl. 1990s – present), British film producer
John Bolt (theologian), American theologian
John F. Bolt (1921–2004), American aviator
Josh Bolt (fl. 2000s – present), British actor
Klaas Bolt (1927–1990), Dutch musician
Michael Bolt (fl. 1980s – 1990s), Australia rugby league player
Ranjit Bolt (b. 1959), British author and translator
Rezin A. De Bolt (1828–1891), American politician
Richard Bolt (1911–2002), American physics professor
Richard Bolt (RNZAF officer) (fl. 1940s–1980), New Zealand air marshal
Robert Bolt (1924–1995), British playwright
 Skye Bolt (b. 1994), American baseball player for the San Francisco Giants
Thomas Bolt (b. 1959), American poet and artist
Tommy Bolt (1916–2008), American golfer
Usain Bolt (b. 1986), Jamaican track athlete
Wayne Bolt (fl. 1980s – present), American football coach

See also
Bolt family 
Udo Bölts (b. 1966), German cyclist
William Bolts (1740–1808), Dutch merchant, trader and author

Surnames from nicknames
Occupational surnames
Surnames from given names
English-language occupational surnames